The year 1845 in science and technology involved some significant events, listed below.

Astronomy
 April – Lord Rosse discovers that the nebula M51 has a spiral structure.
 September–October – Cornish mathematician John Couch Adams communicates to James Challis and George Biddell Airy his calculations demonstrating that a body (Neptune) is perturbing the orbit of Uranus.
 November 10 – Urbain Le Verrier presents to the Académie des sciences in Paris a memoir showing that existing theories fail to account for the motion of Uranus.
 Construction begins in Ireland of the "Leviathan of Parsonstown", a telescope built by Lord Rosse.

Biology
 August–September – Previously unknown Potato blight strikes the potato crop in Ireland: start of the Great Famine.

Chemistry
 March 17 – Stephen Perry patents the rubber band in England.
 Edmond Frémy discovers the oxidizing agent Frémy's salt.

Exploration
 August – John Franklin's expedition with HMS Erebus and HMS Terror to find the Northwest Passage is last seen entering Baffin Bay prior to its mysterious disappearance.

Medicine
 December 27 – Anesthesia is used in childbirth for the first time, by Dr Crawford Long in Jefferson, Georgia.

Physics
 September 13 – Michael Faraday discovers that an intense magnetic field can rotate the plane of polarized light, the Faraday effect.
 C. H. D. Buys Ballot confirms the Doppler effect for sound waves.
 Kirchhoff's circuit laws are first described by German physicist Gustav Kirchhoff.

Technology
 July 26–August 10 – Isambard Kingdom Brunel’s iron steamship Great Britain makes the Transatlantic Crossing from Liverpool to New York, the first screw propelled vessel to make the passage.
 The saxhorn family of valved brass instruments is patented by Adolphe Sax in France.

Publications
 January 14 – Physikalische Gesellschaft zu Berlin established and begins publishing Fortschritte der Physik and Verhandlungen.
 August 28 – The journal Scientific American begins publication.
 Alexander von Humboldt's Kosmos: Entwurf einer physischen Weltbeschreibung begins publication.

Awards
 Copley Medal: Theodor Schwann
 Wollaston Medal for Geology: John Phillips

Births
February 17 (Old Style March 1) – Fyodor Pirotsky (died 1898), Ukrainian-born Russian military and electrical engineer and inventor.
 March 3 – Georg Cantor (died 1918), Russian-born German mathematician.
 March 27 – Wilhelm Röntgen (died 1923), German physicist, discoverer of X-rays, Nobel laureate.
 April 21 – William Healey Dall (died 1927), American malacologist and explorer.
 May 4 – William Kingdon Clifford (died 1879), English geometer.
 May 16 – Élie Metchnikoff (died 1916), Russian-born microbiologist, Nobel laureate.
 June 16 – Heinrich Dressel (died 1920), German archaeologist.
 July 4 – Thomas Barnardo (died 1905), Irish-born physician and philanthropist.
 September 11 – Émile Baudot (died 1903), French telegraph engineer.
 November 14 – Ulisse Dini (died 1918), Italian mathematician.

Deaths
 January 11 – Etheldred Benett (born 1776), British geologist. 
 March 13 – John Frederic Daniell (born 1790), English chemist and physicist.
 March 18 – 'Johnny Appleseed' (John Chapman) (born 1774), American nurseryman.
 April 10 – Thomas Sewall (born 1786), American anatomist.
 October 18 – Dominique, comte de Cassini (born 1748), French astronomer.
 Jean Henri Jaume Saint-Hilaire (born 1772), French botanist.

References

 
19th century in science
1840s in science